James May: The Reassembler is a BBC Four documentary programme focusing on the reassembly of various pieces of technology from the past. The host James May discusses the item, its place in society and the engineering principles of the part while he puts it back together.

Episodes

Series overview

Series 1 (2016)

Series 2 (2016–2017) 

Season 1 has also been shown on Quest and both seasons on Together, in a 1-hour format with commercials.

See also
Wheeler Dealers - A programme showing the buying of a vehicle, and the turn it over to a mechanic for repairs and improvements
Salvage Hunters - A similar concept series, related to buying and selling antiques

References

External links 
 
 

Reassembler
2016 British television series debuts
2017 British television series endings
BBC television documentaries
Documentary television series about technology
English-language television shows